Iulian Chiriță (born 2 February 1967 in Târgoviște) is a Romanian former footballer who played as a midfielder and a manager.

Club career
Iulian Chiriță was born on 2 February 1967 in Târgoviște, Romania, starting to play youth level football at CSȘ Târgoviște. He started to play senior level football in 1985 at CS Târgoviște in Divizia B. He made his Divizia A debut on 18 March 1988 under coach Ion Nunweiller in a 2–0 away loss against Universitatea Craiova, also during his period spent at the club he made his debut in European competitions, playing in both legs of the 4–1 loss on aggregate against Porto in the 1989–90 UEFA Cup. He went to play for one year and a half at FC Brașov, afterwards going to play for Rapid București where he had his most successful period of his career, playing 132 Divizia A matches in which he scored 40 goals, being for a while the team's captain, scoring a goal in the 1995 Cupa României Final which was lost in front of Petrolul Ploiești and appeared in 12 games in which he scored 3 goals in the UEFA Cup. After his spell with Rapid ended, Chiriță returned for a short while at FC Brașov, afterwards going at Dinamo București and Argeș Pitești, ending his career at in the 1998–99 Divizia B season at Chindia Târgoviște. Iulian Chiriță has a total of 262 Divizia A matches in which he scored 57 goals and 15 games with 3 goals scored in the UEFA Cup. After he ended his playing career, Chiriță worked for a short while as a manager at Cimentul Fieni, deciding afterwards that it was not a job he liked.

International career
Iulian Chiriță played three friendly matches at international level for Romania, making his debut on 20 April 1994 under coach Anghel Iordănescu in a 3–0 victory against Bolivia. His following two games were a 2–0 victory against Nigeria and a 0–0 against Slovenia. Chiriță was also part of Romania's squad at the 1994 World Cup where the team reached the quarter-finals, however he did not play in any games from the campaign.

Conviction
Iulian Chiriță in the 1990s was in the entourage of Romanian thugs Fane Spoitoru and Gigi Boeru who after he scored a hat-trick for Rapid against Steaua București in a 4–1 victory from the 1994–95 Cupa României bought him a Dacia car as a gift. While he was living in Barcelona, Spain where he owned a restaurant in Castelldefels, Chiriță was sent to jail in October 2015, receiving a sentence of two years and nine months for being part of a credit card theft mafia network. After executing one year and nine months, he was released from jail, claiming he was wrongfully convicted.

Honours
Rapid București
Cupa României runner-up: 1994–95

References

External links

1967 births
Living people
Sportspeople from Târgoviște
Romanian footballers
FCM Târgoviște players
CSM Flacăra Moreni players
FC Rapid București players
FC Dinamo București players
FC Argeș Pitești players
FC Brașov (1936) players
Romania international footballers
Liga I players
Liga II players
1994 FIFA World Cup players
Association football midfielders
Romanian football managers